Sylvie Cuvilly (born January 10, 1965 in Arras) is a French sprint canoer who competed in the late 1980s. She was eliminated in the semifinals of the K-4 500 m event at the 1988 Summer Olympics in Seoul.

References
 Sports-reference.com profile

External links
 

1965 births
Living people
Sportspeople from Arras
Canoeists at the 1988 Summer Olympics
French female canoeists
Olympic canoeists of France